The Shimofuri goby (Tridentiger bifasciatus) is a species of goby native to marine, brackish and fresh waters along the coasts of eastern Asia.  It has also been introduced to the Pacific Coast of the United States.  This species can reach a length of  TL.

References

Shimofuri goby
Fish of the Pacific Ocean
Fish of East Asia
Fish of Japan
Fish of China
Fish described in 1881